The Count of Hermannstadt, also Count of Sibiu or Count of Szeben, was the head of the Transylvanian Saxons living in the wider region of Hermannstadt (now Sibiu in Romania) in the 13th and early 14th centuries. The counts were royal officials, appointed and dismissed by the Kings of Hungary.

Origins

Jurisdiction

List of the Counts of Hermannstadt

Thirteenth century

Fourteenth century

References

Sources 

Hungarian noble titles
Rulers of Transylvania
Medieval Transylvania